Priolepis aureoviridis, the Yellow-green goby, is a species of goby native to the central Pacific Ocean where it is known to occur in Micronesia, Johnston Atoll and the Hawaiian Islands.  It can be found on the seaward side of reefs and is a secretive fish.  It can reach a length of  TL.

References

aureoviridis
Gobiidae
Fish of Hawaii
Fish described in 1959